Either Way may refer to:

 Either way or hybrid offence, in criminal law
 Either Way (film), a 2011 Icelandic comedy film
 Either Way (album), by Zoot Sims and Al Cohn, 1961
 "Either Way" (Chris Stapleton song), 2017
 "Either Way" (K. Michelle song), 2017
 "Either Way" (Snakehips and Anne-Marie song), 2017
 "Either Way" (The Twang song), 2007